Pata (Finnish for Spades, stylized as PATA, formerly Aces eSport) also known as Porin Ässät is an esports team based in Pori, Finland. The team was founded in 2017. The team was founded in 2017 when Ässät picked up players of a team called REAKT. The team started with playing Overwatch and Counter Strike Global Offensive but dropped them and moved on to NHL video game series. Now the roster of the team consists of two players and they only participate in the eLiiga tournament.

History 
PATA has played in the Finnish Esports League and the ESEA League.

eLiiga 
The Liiga playoffs were played in the NHL 20 video game due to the COVID-19 pandemic. PATA's player was an ex-hockey player Iiro Vehmanen. PATA beat JYP in the first round, but lost on the second round to Kärpät.

Ässät finished 10th in the eLiiga 2020 regular season, and thus did not make it to the playoffs. The games were played in NHL 21.

In the 2021–22 eLiiga season, Ässät finished 4th in the regular season tied with Tappara with 51 points, so it made it into the playoffs. Ässät got eliminated by Tappara in the first round in two games. The games were played in NHL 22.

Current roster

References 

Esports teams established in 2017
Esports teams based in Finland
Ässät